The Grand River Bridge is a historic structure located east of Arispe, Iowa, United States.  It is a 5-panel, single span, Pratt through truss over the Grand River.  The bridge was built in 1885 by the King Iron Bridge Co. of Cleveland, Ohio.  It was listed on the National Register of Historic Places in 1998.

References

Bridges completed in 1885
Transportation buildings and structures in Union County, Iowa
Road bridges on the National Register of Historic Places in Iowa
Truss bridges in Iowa
National Register of Historic Places in Union County, Iowa
Pratt truss bridges in the United States